Simon Paul Funnell (born 8 August 1974) is an English former professional footballer who played as a forward in the Football League for Brighton & Hove Albion.

Life and career
Funnell was born in 1974 in Shoreham-by-Sea, West Sussex, where he attended King's Manor School. He played youth football for Adur Athletic and was an associate schoolboy with Southampton before joining Brighton & Hove Albion as a trainee in 1990. He made his senior debut in May 1992, in the last match of the season that confirmed Brighton's relegation from the Second Division. He turned professional soon afterwards, and made 25 appearances in the 1993–94 season, but played rarely thereafter, and spent time on loan at Sussex County League club Shoreham before being released in 1995. Funnell went on to play non-league football in the Sussex area for clubs including Stamco, Worthing, Bognor Regis Town, Southwick, Oakwood and Three Bridges, before moving into coaching and management at non-league level with clubs including East Grinstead Town, Chipstead, Shoreham, Horsham, and Worthing United.

References

1974 births
Living people
People from Shoreham-by-Sea
English footballers
Association football forwards
Southampton F.C. players
Brighton & Hove Albion F.C. players
Shoreham F.C. players
St. Leonards F.C. players
Worthing F.C. players
Bognor Regis Town F.C. players
Southwick F.C. players
Three Bridges F.C. players
English Football League players
Isthmian League players
English football managers
Shoreham F.C. managers
Footballers from West Sussex